Stephen Rennicks is an Irish musician and film score composer based in Dublin.

Early life
As a boy, Rennicks predominantly listened to and sang what he described as "Irish Protestant Baptist gospel music, choruses and hymns", and later claimed it was an influence on his process of learning harmony.  During the later years of the 1980s, Rennicks was a member of a band called the Prunes, which traveled through nightclubs in France and Germany playing punk music.

Film career
Rennicks worked with director Lenny Abrahamson on What Richard Did (2012). For Abrahamson, he later served as music director for the 2014 film Frank, where he was tasked to write songs that were a hybrid of pop and experimental rock music. Rennicks was inspired by musicians he met while in the Prunes, wrote the score and supervised the recordings of his original songs. For Frank, Rennicks won the award for Best Technical Achievement – Music at the 2014 British Independent Film Awards, and was nominated for Original Score at the 12th Irish Film & Television Awards.

Abrahamson and Rennicks collaborated again on the 2015 film Room. As a Canadian co-production, Rennicks was nominated for the Canadian Screen Award for Best Score in January 2016.  In April, he then won for Original Music at the 13th Irish Film & Television Awards.

Awards and nominations

Notes

References

External links

Living people
21st-century Irish people
Irish film score composers
Musicians from Dublin (city)
People educated at The High School, Dublin
Year of birth missing (living people)